Middle-market can refer to:
 Middle-market newspaper
 Middle-market company

See also
Middle of the market, the airliner market between the narrowbody and the widebody aircraft
Mid-Market, San Francisco, a neighborhood and development area